Hussein Arnous government may refer to the following governments of Syria led by Hussein Arnous:

 First Hussein Arnous government, 2020-2021
 Second Hussein Arnous government, from 2021

See also 
 Cabinet of Syria